Eric Freeman may refer to:

 Eric Freeman (cricketer) (1944–2020), Australian cricketer
 Eric Freeman (actor) (born 1965), American actor
 Eric Freeman (artist) (born 1970), artist based in New York
 Eric Freeman (writer), computer scientist and author